Ammonium dimolybdate (ADM) is the inorganic compound with the formula (NH4)2Mo2O7. It is a white, water-soluble solid. ADM is an intermediate in the production of molybdenum compounds from its ores.  Roasting typical ore produces crude molybdenum(VI) oxides, which can be extracted into aqueous ammonia, affording ammonium molybdate.  Heating solutions of ammonium molybdate gives ADM.  Upon heating, solid ammonium dimolybdate decomposes to molybdenum trioxide:
 (NH4)2Mo2O7   →   2 MoO3  +  2 NH3  +  H2O

In terms of its chemical structure, the anion is a polymeric consisting of distorted octahedral Mo centers liked by tetrahedral molybdate centers.  When prepared in the absence of water as its tetrabutylammonium salt, dimolybdate adopts the centrosymmetric structure observed for dichromate.

References

Molybdates